The Worcester State Hospital Farmhouse is a historic psychiatric hospital building at 361 Plantation Street, on the former grounds of the Worcester State Hospital in Worcester, Massachusetts.  Built in 1895, it is a well-preserved local example of Georgian Revival architecture, and is notable as a prototype for similar buildings in the Massachusetts state hospital network.  It served as an outbuilding of Worcester State Hospital until 1969, housing select residents who worked in its fields.  It now houses state mental health offices.  It was listed on the National Register of Historic Places in 2017.

Description and history
The former Worcester State Hospital Farmhouse is located near the eastern edge of the former Worcester State Hospital complex, a property of more than  that has in part been redeveloped for commercial purposes.  It is located just west of Plantation Street and south of Research Drive.  It is a -story brick building that is L-shaped and covered by a hip roof with two cupolas.  The building was historically divided functionally into a residence for the farm overseer and his family, with a dormitory and residence wing for hospital staff and inmates.  The long dormitory wing is fronted on the Plantation Street side by a long shed-roof porch with a tall latticework skirt obscuring the basement and Tuscan columns for support.

The farmhouse was built in 1895 to a design by the Worcester architects Fuller & Delano.  The Worcester State Hospital, founded in 1833 as the Worcester Lunatic Asylum, had been experiencing increased demand for its services, and in 1870 the state purchased land for the campus on Worcester's east side.  The main building, a large Kirkbride Plan was built soon afterward (and was largely demolished in the 1990s).  At the time of the 1870 land purchase, one of the extant farmhouses was adapted for use to house patients and staff involved in the hospital's agricultural activities.  This building was built as a replacement for that house, and is a particularly elegant example of Georgian Revival architecture.  Its design was used as a model for similar buildings at Danvers State Hospital (since demolished), Medfield State Hospital, and Westborough State Hospital.

See also
National Register of Historic Places listings in eastern Worcester, Massachusetts

References

Houses on the National Register of Historic Places in Massachusetts
Colonial Revival architecture in Massachusetts
Houses completed in 1895
Houses in Worcester, Massachusetts
National Register of Historic Places in Worcester, Massachusetts
Historic district contributing properties in Massachusetts
1895 establishments in Massachusetts